Lake Malawi Museum is a museum on Lake Malawi in Malawi. Situated in the Old Gymkhana Club and organized by the Society of Malawi since 1971 (and likely not updated since then), the museum is located near the Queen Victoria memorial near the Bakili Muluzi Bridge in Mangochi town, Mangochi District, within the Southern Region of Malawi.

Gallery

References

External links
 Lake Malawi National Park Museum on Wikimapia

Museums with year of establishment missing
Museums in Malawi
Local museums
Buildings and structures in Southern Region, Malawi
Museum